Eau de Cologne (German: Kölnisch Wasser ; meaning "Water from Cologne"), or simply cologne, is a perfume originating from Cologne, Germany. Originally mixed by Johann Maria Farina (Giovanni Maria Farina) in 1709, it has since come to be a generic term for scented formulations in typical concentration of 2–5% and also more depending upon its type of essential oils or a blend of extracts, alcohol, and water. In a base of dilute ethanol (70–90%), eau de cologne contains a mixture of citrus oils, including oils of lemon, orange, tangerine, clementine, bergamot, lime, grapefruit, blood orange, bitter orange, and neroli. It can also contain oils of lavender, rosemary, thyme, oregano, petitgrain (orange leaf), jasmine, olive, oleaster, and tobacco.

In contemporary American English usage, the term "cologne" has become a generic term for perfumes marketed toward men. It also may signify a less concentrated, more affordable, version of a popular perfume.

History

The original Eau de Cologne is a spirit-citrus perfume launched in Cologne in 1709 by Giovanni Maria Farina (1685–1766), an Italian perfume maker from Santa Maria Maggiore Valle Vigezzo. In 1708, Farina wrote to his brother Jean Baptiste: "I have found a fragrance that reminds me of an Italian spring morning, of mountain daffodils and orange blossoms after the rain". He named his fragrance Eau de Cologne, in honour of his new hometown.

The Eau de Cologne composed by Farina was used only as a perfume and delivered to "nearly all royal houses in Europe". His ability to produce a constantly homogeneous fragrance consisting of dozens of monoessences was seen as a sensation at the time. A single vial of this aqua mirabilis (Latin for miracle water) cost half the annual salary of a civil servant. When free trade was established in Cologne by the French in 1797, the success of Eau de Cologne prompted countless other businessmen to sell their own fragrances under the name of Eau de Cologne. Giovanni Maria Farina's formula has been produced in Cologne since 1709 by Farina opposite the Jülichplatz and to this day remains a secret. His shop at Obenmarspforten opened in 1709 and is today the world's oldest fragrance factory.

The Original Eau de Cologne 4711 is named after its location at Glockengasse No. 4711. It was also developed in the 18th century by Wilhelm Mülhens and produced in Cologne since at least 1799 and is therefore probably one of the oldest still produced fragrances in the world. On 12 December 2006, the perfumes and cosmetics company Mäurer & Wirtz took over 4711 from Procter & Gamble and has expanded it to a whole brand since then.

In 1806, Jean Marie Joseph Farina, a grand-grand-nephew of Giovanni Maria Farina, opened a perfumery business in Paris that was later sold to Roger & Gallet. That company now owns the rights to Eau de Cologne extra vieille in contrast to the Original Eau de Cologne from Cologne. Originally the water of Cologne was believed to have the power to ward off bubonic plague. By drinking the cologne the citrus oil scent would be exuded through the pores, repelling fleas. Much as flea shampoo for dogs can be based on citrus oils today.

In modern times, eau de Cologne or "cologne" has become a generic term. The term "cologne" can be applied to perfume for men or women, but in American English usage typically refers to perfumes marketed toward men.

The importation of Eau de Cologne into Turkey resulted in the creation of kolonya, a Turkish perfume.

Literary references
Yevgeny Yevtushenko's poem, About Drinking, describes the author coming back from a whaling voyage and arriving at a small town where the local store is out of liquor and, as a substitute, they use a case of Eau de Cologne to drink.

See also
 Aftershave
 Deodorant
 Kolonya

Bibliography

References
Citations

Works cited
 

 Information leaflet of the Farina Fragrance Museum at Cologne

External links

Farina Gegenüber: Official website
4711: Official website
Deutsche Welle 13.07.2009: Original eau de Cologne celebrates 300 years
Basenotes 18 June 2009: An interview with Johann Maria Farina

Toiletry
Perfumery
History of Cologne
Culture in Cologne
Economy of Cologne
1709 introductions
Tourist attractions in Cologne
Perfumes